Eppenbrunn is a municipality in Südwestpfalz district, in Rhineland-Palatinate, western Germany and belongs to the municipal association Pirmasens-Land.

Within the municipality is the 1.5 km long bunter sandstone formation called the Altschlossfelsen, which lies by the French border and was settled as early as Roman times.

References

Municipalities in Rhineland-Palatinate
Palatinate Forest
Südwestpfalz